The O2 Academy Sheffield (formerly the Carling Academy Sheffield), is a live music venue in the centre of Sheffield, South Yorkshire, England. It is a £3 million refurbishment of the former "Roxy Nightclub" and opened on 11 April 2008.

History
In 2007 the Academy Music Group announced that it had acquired the former Roxy Disco nightclub and was to transform it into the "Carling Academy Sheffield". The venue opened on 11 April 2008, with Reverend and the Makers playing on the opening night. On 6 November 2008, it was announced that Telefónica Europe (owners of the O2 Network in the UK) had become the new sponsor of all Academy venues, in a deal with music promoter Live Nation. The deal, which lasts for five years, sees all venues rebranded "The O2 Academy", in line with Telefónica's purchase of the Millennium Dome (now The O2).

There has been some opposition from rival nightclub owners in the area, claiming more licensed premises would be an increase in crime and disorder. However, the police did not support these claims.

Reverend & The Makers' second live album, Reverend and The Makers Live in Sheffield, was recorded at the venue and released in December 2012.

Structure
There are two separate performance areas for both live music and smaller club events.

O2 Academy Sheffield
The O2 Academy Sheffield includes "a large main auditorium with a capacity of 2,350 and a secondary smaller room, emulating the success of its multi-room format at other AMG venues across the country, to hold 600." It will aim to attract British and international touring artists in the same way that AMG's other venues do.

O2 Academy Sheffield 2
The O2 Academy Sheffield 2 is capable of hosting smaller, up and coming artists or other small-scale events. The capacity for this room is 500.

References

External links
O2 Academy Sheffield – Official Website

Music venues in South Yorkshire
Academy Sheffield
Buildings and structures in Sheffield
Wrestling venues